State Coroner is an Australian television series screened on Network Ten in 1997 and 1998. There were two series produced with a total of 28 episodes.

The series was set in the State Coroner's office complex and featured investigations into deaths, murders, suicides, accidents and natural causes. The drama begins from the initial inquiry through to the courtroom appearances, the Coroner's final verdict and recommendations for trial or reform.

Cast
 Wendy Hughes as Kate Ferrari 
 Bob Baines as Clive Trimble 
 Andrew Clarke as Colin Decker 
 Christopher Stollery as Dermot McLeod 
 Elaine Smith as Julie Travers 
 Nick Carrafa as George Cardillo 
 Elise McCredie as Sharon Riley 
 Kristian Pithie as Paul Weiss 
 Christopher Gabardi as Daniel Ferris 
 James Reyne as Liam Pearce 
 Robert Grubb as Hugh Ferrari 
 Asher Keddie as Claire Ferrari 
 Paul Cronin as Ted Ames 
 Jennifer Botica as Liz Mason 
 Martin Jacobs as Frank Kelso 
 Alan Dale Dudley Mills 
 Richard Moss as Gascoyne 
 Jerome Pride as Roly Fox 
 Peter Hosking as Phil Daly

Series overview

Episodes 

Episode information retrieved from the Australian Television archive.

Season 1 (1997)

Season 2 (1998)

See also
 List of Australian television series

External links
State Coroner at the National Film and Sound Archive

References

Australian drama television series
Network 10 original programming
1997 Australian television series debuts
1998 Australian television series endings
Television series by Crawford Productions